The Seagram Company Ltd. (which traded as Seagram's) was a Canadian multinational conglomerate formerly headquartered in Montreal, Quebec. Originally a distiller of Canadian whisky based in Waterloo, Ontario, it was once (in the 1990s) the largest owner of alcoholic beverage lines in the world.

Toward the end of its independent existence, it also controlled various entertainment and other business ventures. Its purchase of MCA Inc., whose assets included Universal Studios and its theme parks, was financed through the sale of Seagram's 25% holding of chemical company DuPont, a position it acquired in 1981.

Seagram later imploded, with its beverage assets wholesaled off to various industry titans, notably Diageo, Infinium Spirits, and Pernod Ricard. Universal's television holdings were sold to media entrepreneur Barry Diller, and the balance of the Universal entertainment empire and what was Seagram was sold to French conglomerate Vivendi in 2000.

History
In 1857, Waterloo Distillery was founded in Waterloo, Ontario, Canada. Joseph E. Seagram became a partner with George Randall, William Roos and William Hespeler in 1869 and sole owner in 1883, and the company became known as Joseph E. Seagram & Sons. Many decades later, in 1924, Samuel Bronfman and his brothers founded Distillers Corporation Limited, in Montreal, which enjoyed substantial growth in the 1920s, in part due to Prohibition in the United States (the Distillers Corporation Limited name was derived from a United Kingdom company called Distillers Company Limited, which controlled the leading brands of whisky in the UK, and which was doing business with the Bronfmans).

In 1923, the Bronfmans purchased the Greenbrier Distillery in the United States, dismantled it, shipped it to Canada, and reassembled it in LaSalle, Quebec. The Bronfmans shipped liquor from Canada to the French-controlled overseas collectivity Saint Pierre and Miquelon off the then-Dominion of Newfoundland, which was then shipped by bootleggers to rum rows in New York, New Jersey and other states.

In 1928, a few years after the death of Joseph E. Seagram (1919), the Distillers Corporation acquired Joseph E. Seagram & Sons from heir and President Edward F. Seagram; the merged company retained the Seagram name. The company was prepared for the end of Prohibition in 1933 with an ample stock of aged whiskeys, ready to sell to the newly-opened American market. It prospered accordingly.

Although he was never convicted of criminal activity, Samuel Bronfman's dealings with bootleggers during the Prohibition-era in the United States have been researched by various historians and are documented in various peer-vetted chronicles.

In the 1930s, when Seagram established business in the United States, it paid a fine of $1.5 million to the US government to settle delinquent excise taxes on liquor illegally exported to the US during Prohibition. The US government had originally asked for $60 million.

After the death of Samuel Bronfman in 1971, Edgar M. Bronfman was named chairman and chief executive officer (CEO) until June 1994 when his son, Edgar Bronfman Jr., was appointed CEO.

From the 1950s, most of Distillers-Seagram was owned by the four children of Samuel Bronfman, through their holding company Cemp Investments. The three most-popular Seagram distilled products in the 1960s through 1990s were Seven Crown, VO, and Crown Royal.

In 1978 Seagram's took over the Stonyfell winery in the eastern foothills of Adelaide from Dalgety Australia, around which time the winemaking part of the business at Stonyfell was wound up.

In 1981, cash-rich and wanting to diversify, the U.S.-based subsidiary Seagram Company Ltd. engineered a takeover of Conoco Inc., a major American oil and gas producing company. Although Seagram acquired a 32.2% stake in Conoco, DuPont was brought in as a white knight by the oil company and entered the bidding war. Seagram lost in the Conoco bidding war, though in exchange for its stake in Conoco it became a 24.3% owner of DuPont. By 1995, Seagram was DuPont's largest single shareholder with four seats on its board.

In 1986, the company started a TV commercial campaign advertising its Golden wine cooler products. With rising star Bruce Willis as pitchman, Seagram rose from fifth place among distillers to first in just two years.

In 1987, Seagram engineered a $1.2 billion takeover of French cognac maker Martell & Cie.

In 1995, Edgar Bronfman Jr. was eager to enter the film and electronic media business. On April 6, 1995, after being approached by Bronfman, DuPont announced a deal whereby the company would buy back its shares from the Seagram Company for $9 billion. Seagram was heavily criticized by the investment community—the 24.3% stake in DuPont accounted for 70% of Seagram's earnings. Standard & Poor's took the unusual step of stating that the sale of the DuPont interest could result in a downgrade of Seagram's more than $4.2 billion of long-term debt. Bronfman used the proceeds of the sale to acquire a controlling interest in MCA from Matsushita, whose assets included Universal Pictures and its theme parks. Later, Seagram purchased PolyGram and Deutsche Grammophon.

In 2000, Edgar Bronfman Jr. sold controlling interest in Seagram's entertainment division to Vivendi, and the beverage division to Pernod Ricard and Diageo. By the time Vivendi began auctioning off Seagram's beverages business, the once-renowned operation consisted of around 250 drink brands and brand extensions in addition to its original high-profile brand names.

A license from Pernod Ricard to produce Seagram's Cooler Escapes and Seagram's malt-beverage brands has been held by North American Breweries (formerly KPS) since 2009.

On April 19, 2006, Pernod Ricard announced that they would be closing the former Seagram distillery in Lawrenceburg, Indiana. The distillery was instead sold in 2007 to CL Financial, a holding company based in Trinidad and Tobago which then collapsed and required government intervention. They operated the distillery as Lawrenceburg Distillers Indiana. In December 2011, the distillery was purchased by MGP Ingredients, headquartered in Atchison, Kansas. It is now known as MGP of Indiana, and continues to be the source of the components of Seagram's Seven Crown, now owned by Diageo.

In a 2013 interview with The Globe and Mail, Charles Bronfman (uncle of Edgar Jr.) stated about the decisions leading to the demise of Seagram: "It was a disaster, it is a disaster, it will be a disaster. It was a family tragedy."

In 2018, Diageo sold several Seagram's brands to Sazerac including Seagram's VO, but retained the Seven Crown brand.

Legacy 

The Seagram name survives today in various well-known drinks. Seagram's Seven Crown, used to make the American cocktail, 7 and 7, is produced by Diageo, while Seagram's V.O. is produced by Sazerac. Several brands of coolers are produced under the Seagram name as of 2022: Seagram's Escapes are produced by Genesee Brewing for the American market, while Seagram Island Time is produced by Waterloo Brewing for the Canadian market.

Seagram's House, the former company headquarters in Montreal, was donated to McGill University by Vivendi Universal in 2002, then renamed Martlet House. The landmarked Seagram Building, once the company's American headquarters in New York City, was commissioned by Phyllis Lambert, daughter of Seagram CEO Samuel Bronfman, and designed by architect Ludwig Mies van der Rohe with Philip Johnson. Regarded as one of the most notable examples of the functionalist aesthetic and a prominent instance of corporate modern architecture, it set the trend for the city's skyline for decades to follow, and has been featured in several Hollywood films. On completion in 1958, its costs made it the world's most expensive skyscraper. The Bronfman family sold the Seagram building to TIAA for $70.5 million in 1979.

The Seagram Museum, formerly the original Seagram distillery in Waterloo, Ontario, was forced to close due to lack of funds in 1997. The building is now the home of the Centre for International Governance Innovation as well as Shopify. The two original barrel houses are now the Seagram Lofts condominiums. There were almost  of open land, upon which the Balsillie School of International Affairs was subsequently built; construction began in 2009, and was completed in 2010.

See also 
 
 Seagram Museum

References

 Faith, Nicholas. The Bronfmans: The Rise and Fall of the House of Seagram, 2006. .

External links
 Seagram Museum Collection RG 490 – Brock University Library Digital Repository

 
Distilleries in Canada
Canadian brands
Coca-Cola brands
Defunct manufacturing companies of Canada
Defunct mass media companies of Canada
Companies based in Montreal
Entertainment companies of the United States
Manufacturing companies established in 1857
Manufacturing companies disestablished in 2000
Bronfman family
Ginger ale
Jewish Canadian history
Pernod Ricard brands
Former Vivendi subsidiaries
Canadian companies established in 1857